Cold Dog Soup may refer to:

 Cold Dog Soup (album), a 1999 album by Guy Clark
 Cold Dog Soup (film), a 1990 film directed by Alan Metter
 Cold Dog Soup (novel), a 1985 novel by Stephen Dobyns